Lauri Hussar (born 4 September 1973) is an Estonian journalist. He was the editor-in-chief of Postimees 2016–2019. Since 15 October 2022 he is chairman of the party Estonia 200.

Career 
Hussar studied theology at Tartu University from 1992 to 1996. From 1998 to 2006, he worked as a TV reporter and editor for TV3, including work as one of the hosts of 2000 Today.

He then hosted Vikerraadio, a radio program broadcast nationwide by Eesti Rahvusringhääling (ERR, Estonian Public Broadcasting), until the spring of 2016. In March 2016, he became deputy editor-in-chief of Postimees. Three months later, he was promoted to editor-in-chief.

On 15 October 2022 Hussar was elected as leader of the political party Eesti 200.

Personal life 
Lauri Hussar has been married since July 2008.

In 1994, he was one of the refounders of the Christian Studentenverbindung (fraternity) "Arminia Dorpatensis" (first founded in 1850), the northernmost and only Estonian branch of Wingolf.

References 

1973 births
Estonia 200 politicians
Estonian journalists
European newspaper editors
Estonian radio personalities
Living people
Members of the Riigikogu, 2023–2027
Place of birth missing (living people)
Television editors
University of Tartu alumni